The 2019 Thai League 4 is the 19th season of the Thai League 4, the fourth-tier professional league for association football clubs in Thailand, since its establishment in 2006 as the regional league division 2, also known as Omsin League due to the sponsorship deal with Government Savings Bank (Omsin Bank). A total of 60 teams would divided into 6 regions.

Regional League stage All locations

2019
Green Zone: 2019 Thai League 4 Northern Region
Orange Zone: 2019 Thai League 4 Northeastern Region
Yellow Zone : 2019 Thai League 4 Eastern Region
Pink Zone: 2019 Thai League 4 Western Region
Red Zone : 2019 Thai League 4 Bangkok Metropolitan Region
Blue Zone: 2019 Thai League 4 Southern Region

List of Qualified Teams

Upper zone 

T4 North (2)

T4 Northeast (2)

T4 East (2)

Lower zone 

T4 West (2)

T4 Bangkok (2)

T4 South (2)

Regional stage
The number of teams in 6 regions including 10 teams in the Northern region, 13 teams in the Northeastern region, 8 teams in the Eastern region, 9 teams in the Western region, 7 teams in the Southern region, and 13 teams in the Bangkok metropolitan region. The reserve of Thai League 1 and Thai League 2 teams could compete in Thai League 4 as team (B) but they could not be promoted or relegated. If the reserve team finished in the bottom half of their region's league table, they would be suspended in the next season.

The winners and runners-up (except reserve teams) of each regions will advance to the champions league stage to finding 4 teams promoting to the 2020 Thai League 3. Meanwhile, the last placed (except reserve teams) of each regions will relegate to the 2020 Thailand Amateur League.

Northern region

League table

Northeastern region

League table

Eastern region

League table

Western region

League table

Southern region

League table

Bangkok Metropolitan region

League table

Champions League stage

The champions league stage is the next stage from the regional stage. 1st and 2nd places of each zone qualified to this stage by featured in 2 groups. Teams from Northern, Northeastern, and Eastern regions would have qualified to the upper group. Meanwhile, teams from Western, Southern, and Bangkok Metropolitan regions would have qualified to the lower group. Winners and runners-ups of the upper and lower groups would promoted to the 2020 Thai League 3.

Group stage
Upper region

Lower region

Final round

Third place play-off

Summary

|}

Matches

Muang Loei United won 7–3 on aggregate.

Champion round
Champion of Upper group and Lower group in Group Stage round pass this round. Winner of Champion round get champion of 2019 Thai League 4

Summary

|}

Matches

2–2 on aggregate. Wat Bot City won 6–5 on penalties.

References

External links
 Official website of Thai League

Thai League 4
2019 in Thai football leagues